Natalya "Natasha" Maratovna Zvereva (born 16 April 1971) is a former professional tennis player from Belarus. She was the first major athlete in the Soviet Union to demand publicly that she should be able to keep her tournament earnings. Zvereva and her main doubles partner Gigi Fernández are the most successful women's doubles team (measured by WTA Tour and major titles) since Martina Navratilova and Pam Shriver.

On 12 July 2010, Zvereva was inducted into the International Tennis Hall of Fame alongside Fernández.

Personal life
Zvereva was born as Natalya Maratovna Zvereva in Minsk, Belarus to parents Marat Nikolayevich Zverev and Nina Grigoryevna Zvereva. She started tennis at the age of seven at the encouragement of her parents, who were both tennis instructors in the Soviet Union. While her name is sometimes spelled Zverava, in 1994 she officially changed her name to Natasha Zvereva. At 18, answering the question about her personal symbol of success, she famously replied the following: "A red Mercedes-Benz, a big one".

Career
As a junior, Zvereva won the Wimbledon girls' singles title in 1986, defeating Leila Meskhi in the final 2–6, 6–2, 9–7. Zvereva also won the US Open girls singles championship in 1987, beating Sandra Birch in the final 6–0, 6–3.

After turning pro, Zvereva won four WTA Tour singles titles and 80 WTA Tour doubles titles, 18 of them in Grand Slam tournaments: five at Wimbledon, four at the US Open, five at the French Open, and four at the Australian Open. She won those Grand Slam doubles titles with four different partners: Gigi Fernández, Martina Hingis, Pam Shriver, and Larisa Savchenko Neiland. She achieved non-calendar year Grand Slams twice: in 1992–93 with Fernández and in 1996–97 with Fernández (three tournaments) and Hingis (Australia).

In addition to her Grand Slam doubles titles, Zvereva teamed with Meskhi to win a bronze medal at the 1992 Olympics in Barcelona.

Although Zvereva was a highly accomplished doubles player, and considered by some to be one of the best doubles players of all time, she had limited success in singles. Nevertheless, in 1988, at the age of 17, she made her sole Grand Slam singles final at the French Open beating Martina Navratilova en route. In a highly publicized final, she lost to Steffi Graf 0–6, 0–6 in only 34 minutes. The official time of the match given on the scoresheet was 34 minutes, however just 32 minutes of that was spent on the court, as a rain break split the match into two periods of play, of nine and 23 minutes. This was the shortest and most one-sided Grand Slam final ever. (Graf went on to win all four Grand Slam singles titles and an Olympic gold medal that year.)

Zvereva is one of the few players to have beaten both Graf and Monica Seles, both former world number ones, in the same Grand Slam singles tournament. Ten years later at Wimbledon in 1998, Zvereva defeated the fourth-seeded Graf in the third round 6–4, 7–5 and the sixth-seeded Seles in a quarterfinal 7–6, 6–2. This was also notable because it was Zvereva's sole win over Graf in 21 career singles matches. She lost in the semifinals to Nathalie Tauziat which was to be her second best career Grand Slam singles result. Starting with the French Open in 1987 and extending through Wimbledon in 2000, Zvereva played in 51 of the 54 Grand Slam singles tournaments held, reaching the quarterfinals or better eight times.

In addition to her Grand Slam women's doubles titles, Zvereva twice won the mixed-doubles title at the Australian Open. She partnered with Jim Pugh to win the title in 1990 and with Rick Leach in 1995.

Zvereva retired from professional tennis in 2003. Her last appearance in a Grand Slam tournament was in Wimbledon 2002, where she lost in the first round to Marlene Weingärtner 6–4, 3–6, 2–6.

Playing style
Zvereva used a baseline, counter-punching style centered around topspin and her double-handed backhand. She had great hands, used a variety of spins, and was willing to rush the net and volley. Though Zvereva's talent was never in doubt, she often suffered from lapses in concentration during matches and in her confidence as a singles player.

Significant finals

Grand Slam finals

Singles: 1 (runner-up)

Doubles: 31 (18 titles, 13 runner-ups)

Mixed doubles: 4 (2 titles, 2 runner-ups)

Olympic Games

Doubles: 1 bronze medal

Meskhi and Zvereva lost in the semifinals to Gigi Fernández and Mary Joe Fernández 4–6, 5–7. In 1992, there was no bronze medal play-off match, both beaten semifinal pairs received bronze medals.

Year-end championships finals

Doubles: 6 (3 titles, 3 runner-ups)

WTA career finals

Singles: 19 (4–15)

Doubles: 129 (80–49)

ITF finals

Singles: 4 (3–1)

Doubles: 4 (3–1)

Other finals

Singles (3–0)

Doubles (2–1)

Mixed (1–0)

Grand Slam performance timelines

Singles

Doubles

References

External links
 
 
 
 
 
 

1971 births
Living people
Australian Open (tennis) champions
Belarusian female tennis players
French Open champions
Hopman Cup competitors
Olympic medalists in tennis
Olympic tennis players of the Soviet Union
Olympic tennis players of the Unified Team
Olympic tennis players of Belarus
Olympic bronze medalists for the Unified Team
Tennis players from Minsk
Soviet female tennis players
Tennis players at the 1988 Summer Olympics
Tennis players at the 1992 Summer Olympics
Tennis players at the 1996 Summer Olympics
Tennis players at the 2000 Summer Olympics
US Open (tennis) champions
Wimbledon champions
Wimbledon junior champions
US Open (tennis) junior champions
Grand Slam (tennis) champions in women's doubles
Grand Slam (tennis) champions in mixed doubles
Grand Slam (tennis) champions in girls' singles
Grand Slam (tennis) champions in girls' doubles
Honoured Masters of Sport of the USSR
Medalists at the 1992 Summer Olympics
International Tennis Hall of Fame inductees
WTA number 1 ranked doubles tennis players
ITF World Champions